Casa Xurrina  is a house located in Escaldes-Engordany Parish, Andorra. It is a heritage property registered in the Cultural Heritage of Andorra. It was built in 1948–50.

References

Escaldes-Engordany
Houses in Andorra
Houses completed in 1950
Cultural Heritage of Andorra